The Ciudad de México Cup Tournament was a minor international football competition, which took place in the summer of 1985 in Mexico City.

Host nation Mexico, England and Italy participated in the tournament, with Italy winning. All matches took place at the Estadio Azteca, home of Mexican team Club América. The three-nation mini-tournament was arranged as a preparatory exercise for Mexico, who would host the World Cup tournament the following year.

The final game of this tournament also served as the first game of the 1985 Azteca 2000 Tournament.

Results

This match also counted as the first match of the 1985 Azteca 2000 Tournament.

Table

Despite having the same number of points and the same goal difference as Mexico, Italy won the tournament as they had scored one more goal.

Winners

Statistics

Goalscorers

References

External links 
RSSSF

1985
1984–85 in Mexican football
1984–85 in English football
1984–85 in Italian football